Holocartoons is an Iranian  website critical of Zionism launched on August 2010. The site, which opens to the Pink Panther theme song, aims to undermine the historic dimensions of the mass murder of Jews during World War II. The site is based on a comic book written by Omid Mehdinejad and illustrated by Maziar Bijani. In the preface it opens as following:

Reactions 
On August 5, 2010, Yad Vashem, issued a statement calling the site "The latest salvo emanating from Iran that denies the facts of the Holocaust and attempts to influence those who are ignorant of history."

After its publication, the site has been attacked by Jewish blogs worldwide as being blatantly anti-Semitic due to its questioning of the Holocaust. Nevertheless, the site itself has responded to charges of anti-Semitism by mentioning in the first page that it respects people of all faiths killed in World War II, Jew, Muslim or Christian. The site itself has claimed to promote no hatred of the Jewish faith or people, and only questions the history of the Holocaust and its basis on the creation of the state of Israel on the land of Arabs and Muslims, using cartoon satire. The preface says:
 The faithful Moses followers are our brothers as prophet Moses is our prophet's brother and a great prophet. With us, the Zionists are different from the true followers of Moses and in this book they have been dealt with differently and the book refers to the Zionists.

See also 
Holocaust denial
Iran–Israel relations

References

External links 
 Yad Vashem press release

Holocaust-denying websites
Holocaust denial in Iran